In music, Op. 131 stands for Opus number 131. Compositions that are assigned this number include:

 Beethoven – String Quartet No. 14
 Prokofiev – Symphony No. 7
 Schumann – Fantasy in C for violin and orchestra
 Shostakovich – October (symphonic poem)